The House or Lineage of Serroelofs or  t’Serroelofs (French: Lignage Serroelofs) is one of the Seven Noble Houses of Brussels along with the Houses of: Sleeus, Serhuyghs, Steenweeghs, Sweerts, Coudenberg, and Roodenbeke.

The  Serroelofs House was charged with the defence of the Anderlecht gate, seconded as of 1422 by the nation of Saint-Christophe.

Escutcheon 
Gules that is Brussels, nine billets argent, positioned 4, 3 and 2.

The Seven Noble Houses of Brussels 

The Seven noble houses of Brussels were the seven families of Brussels whose descendants formed the patrician class of that city, and to whom special privileges in the government of that city were granted until the end of the Ancien Régime.

Together with the Guilds of Brussels they formed the Bourgeoisie of the city.

Authority 
Content in this edit is translated from the existing French Wikipedia article at :fr:Lignage Serroelofs; see its history for attribution.

See also 

 Seven Noble Houses of Brussels
House of Sweerts
House of Coudenbergh
House of Roodenbeke
House of Sleeus
House of Serhuyghs
House of Steenweeghs
 Bourgeois of Brussels
 Guilds of Brussels

References 

 
Seven Noble Houses of Brussels
Belgian families
People from Brussels-Capital Region